Kanakalatha (born 24 August 1960) is an Indian actress who works predominantly in the Malayalam cinema.

Personal life

Kanakalatha was born to parents Parameshwaran Pillai and Chinnamma at Kollam, Kerala. She attended the Government Girls School, Kollam. Before becoming a cine actress she was a theater artist. She is divorced.

Filmography

Tamil
 Smart Boys
 Karpooramullai (1991)
 Unakkaga Piranthen (1992)
 Kathaluku Mamane
 Enakkayi Pirathen
 Unnai Partha Naal
 Kadavul Sakshi
 Oru Tharam Udayamakrithu
 Uzhaikkum Paadhai (2018)
 Ilai
 Nadodikoottam
 Senkuruli

Malayalam

 3 Days
 Idukki Blasters
 Kakkapola
 Iruttu
 Vellaripravukal
 Vallakkaran Kunjaouseph
 Salkarmam
 Joemon
 Kochiyude Tharangal
 One Day Driving
 Gypsy	
 Vellakkuppaayam	
 Taka Toka Tanka	
 Gurunaaraayanam	
 Seven Samurai
 Aravindan Parayatte 	
 Maayavanam Bunglow	
 Swarmappathaayam	 
 Thaandavar
 Pookkalam
 Smart Boys
 Aadhyaksharangal	
 Jack Fruit	
 Karuppu  
 Samadhanathinte Vellaripraavukal
 The Reaction
 Late Marriage 
 IPC 302 (2023)
 Oru Pappadavada Premam (2021) as Faisal's mother
 Prasnapariharashala  (2019)
 Oru Patham Classile Pranayam (2019)
 Aakasha Ganga 2 (2019) as Daisy's mother
 Arayakkadavil (2019)
 Sakthan Market (2019) as Sumithra
 Priyapettavar (2019)
 Vishudha Pusthakam (2019) 
 Kosrakollikal (2019) as Devayani
 Vallikkettu (2019) as Mary
 Oru Dubaikkary (2018) as Pushpa
 Ippozhum Eppozhum Sthuthiyayirikkatte (2018)  as Sumarani
 Police Junior (2018)
 Purple (2018)
 Kenalum Kinarum (2018)
 Panchavarnathatha (2018) as Bride's Mother 
 Pakal Pole (2017)
 Red Run (2017) as Suran's mother
 Devakinadanam (2017) as Renuka
Dance Dance (2017)
 Aneesia (2016)
 My God (2015)
 Moonam Naal (2015)
 Aashamsakalode Anna (2015)
 Elanjikkavu P.O. (2015)
 Kanamarayathu (2015)
 Konthayum Poonoolum (2014) as Nun
 Alice: A True Story (2014)
 Asuran (2014)
 Dear Friends (2013)
 Dracula 2012 (2013)
 Lakshmi Vilasam Renuka Makan Raghuram (2012)
 Red Alert (2012)
 Achante Aanmakkal (2012) 
 Bombay Mittayi (2012)
 Ninnishtam Ennishtam 2 (2011)
 Raghuvinte Swantham Rasiya (2011)
 Uppukandam Brothers: Back in Action (2011) as Sathyaneshan's wife
 Priyappetta Nattukare (2011)
101 Uruppika (2011)
 Uthappante Kinar (2011)
 Kanyakumari Express (2010) as Meera Bhai
 Brahmasthram (2010)
 Yakshiyum Njanum (2010)
 Senior Mandrake (2010)
 My Big Father (2009) as Khadeeja
 Dalamarmarangal (2009) as Radha
 Thavalam (2008) as Thamara's mother
 Ayudham (2008)
 Thrill (2008)
 Kovalam (2008)
 Indrajith (2007)
 Achante Ponnumakkal (2006) as Rajalakshmi
 Pakal (2006)
 Videsi Nair Swadesi Nair (2005) as Suma
 Kalyanakkurimanam (2005)
 Izhra (2005)
 Kottaram Vaidyan (2004)
 Swarna Medal (2004)
 Njan Salpperu Ramankutty (2004)
 Sundarikkutty (2003)
 Swantham Malavika (2003)
 Anyar (2003) as Mymuna's mother
 Desam (2002)
 Sesham (2002)
 Indraneelakkallu (2002)
 Chirikkudukka (2002) as Komalavally
Aabharanachaarthu (2002)
Sundaripravu (2002) as Sarath's mother
 Vezhambal (2001)
 Agrahaaram (2001)
 Pranayaaksharangal (2001)
 Ee Raavil (2001)
 Ee Nadu Innalevare (2001) as Thankamani 
 Sharja To Sharja (2001)
 Korappan The Great (2001) as Korappan's wife
 Naranathu Thampuran (2001) as Sulochana
 Dost (2001)
 Swargavaathil (2001)
 Jamindar (2001)
 Rithumathi (2001)
 Vakkalathu Narayanankutty (2001) as Officer
 Bhadra (2001)
 Priyam (2000) as Unni's wife
 Cover Story (2000)
 The Judgement (2000) as Bharathi
 The Warrant (2000) as Aparna's aunt
 Mera Naam Joker(2000) as Dinamma
 Pilots (2000)
 Priye Ninakkaayi (2000)
 Neelathadaakatthile Nizhalppakshikal (2000)
 Indulekha (1999)
 Swarnanilavu (1999)
 Pushpull
 Stalin Sivadas (1999) as Saramma
 Aakasha Ganga (1999) as Daisy's mother
 Onnaamvattam Kandappol (1999) as Sophia's aunt
 Kannezhuthi Pottum Thottu (1999)
 Tokyo Nagarathile Visheshangal (1999) as Kanakam
 F.I.R (1999) as Madhavi/Mariya
 Mattupetti Machan (1998) as Santha Prabhu
 British Market (1998) as Changanassery Sister
 Chenapparambile Aanakkaryam (1998) as Kuttikrishna Menon's wife
 Harikrishnans (1998) as Ammalu's aunt
 Aghosham (1998) as Leelamma
 Mayilpeelikkavu (1998)
 Mayaponman (1997)
 Manthramothiram (1997) as Lakshmi's mother
 Aniathipravu (1997) as Gracy
 Ancharakkalyaanam (1997) as Karthiyayani
Adukkala Rahasyam Angaadi Paattu (1997) as Meena
 Sankeerthanam Pole (1997) as Cameo appearance
 Oru Yathramozhi (1997)
 Raajathanthram (1997) as Keshava Menon's wife
 Varnapakittu (1997) as Sunny's elder sister
 Newspaper Boy (1997) as Prasannakumari
 The Good Boys (1997)
 Guru (1997)
 Kilukil Pambaram (1997)
 Killikurishiyile Kudumbamela (1997) as Kunjannamma 
 Kinnam Katta Kallan (1996)
 Samoohyapaadam (1996) as Kanakalatha
 Kanchanam (1996) as Pro. Ravi's wife
 Hitlist (1996)
 Lalanam (1996) as Matron
 Malayala Masam Chingam Onninu (1996)
 Sathyabhaamaykkoru Pranayalekhanam (1996) as Kochammini
 Pallivathukkal Thomichan (1996) as Kathreena's sister
 Mayoora Nritham (1996) as Sakunthala
 Sankeeerthanam Pole (1996)
 Nandagopalante Kusruthikal (1996)
 Parvathy Parinayam (1995) as Savithri
 Maanthrikante Praavukal (1995)
 Achan Rajavu Appan Jethavu (1995) as Annamma
 Puthukkottayile Puthumanavalan (1995) as Bhanumathi
 Maanikyachempazhukka (1995) as Sumi/Sumangala Devi
 Kakkakkum Poochakkum Kalyanam (1995)
 Aniyan Baava Chettan Baava (1995) as Devi Thampuratti
 Spadikam (1995) as Kuttikadan's wife
 Perariyappookkal (1995) as Radhika's mother
 Kusruthikkaattu (1995) as Indira's aunt
 Thumbolikadappuram (1995)
 Oru Panchathanthram Katha (1995)
 Sipayi Lahala (1995) as Thankamma
 Thacholi Varghese Chekavar (1995) as Omana
 Aadyathe Kanmani (1995) as Kausalya
 Kalamasheriyil Kalyanayogam (1995) as Soudamini
 Mangalam Veettil Manaseswari Gupte (1995)
 Kokkarakko (1995) as Meenakshi
 Kalyaanji Aanandji (1995) as Kalyanakrishnan's sis-in-law
 Prayikkara Pappan (1995)
 Keerthanam (1995) as Kariya's wife
 Sundaran Neeyum Sundaran Njanum (1995) as Subhadra
 Tharavaadu (1994) as Srilakshmi
 Bheesmacharya (1994)
 Vadhu Doctoranu (1994) as Bharathi
 Nandini Oppol (1994)
 Harichandanam (1994)
 Manthrikante Pravukal (1994)
Cabinet(1994) as Gomathiyamma
 Pidakozhi Koovunna Noottandu (1994) as Malathi Menon
 Vendor Daniel State Licensy (1994)
 Vaardhakyapuraanam (1994) as Sumithra
 Varanamaalyam (1994) as Vasanthi
 Manathe Kottaram (1994) as Servant
 Moonnaam Loka Pattaalam (1994) as Sasi's mother
 Kinnaripuzhayoram (1994) as Savithri
 Dollar (1994) as Eliyamma
 Ponthanmada (1994)
 Saubhaagyam (1993) as Suseela
 Chenkol (1993) as Ambika
 Addeham Enna Iddeham (1993) as Seithali's wife
 Mithunam (1993) as Sivaraman's wife
 Bandhukkal Sathrukkal (1993) as Chellamma
 Customs Diary (1993) as Mercykutty
 Uppukandam Brothers (1993) as Annamma
 Gandhari (1993)
 Padaliputhram (1993)
 Ammayane Sathyam (1993)
 Bharathettan Varunnu (1993)
 Thalamura (1993) as Gracy
 Kudumbasametham (1992) as Uma
 Oru Kochu Bhoolikilukkam (1992) as Soudhamini
 Kauravar (1992) as School Teacher
 Kizhakkan Pathrose (1992) as Fish vendor
 Ennodishtam Koodamo (1992)
 Mukhamudra (1992)
 Kallanum Policum (1992) as Devaki
 Welcome To Kodaikkanal (1992) as Teacher
 Ennum Nanmakal (1991) as Devaki
 Inspector Balram (1991) as Madhavan's wife
 Koodikazhcha (1991) as Saraswathi
 Kasargod Khader Bhai (1991) as Latha's mother
 Souhrudam (1991) as Mrs.Menon
 Nayam Vyakthamakkunnu (1991)
 Mimics Parade (1991)
 Ente Sooryaputhrikku (1991)
 Aadhyamayi (1991)
 Bhoomika (1991) as Yasodhamma
 Appu (1990) as Elizabeth
 Superstar (1990) as Panchali
 Kaattu Kuthira (1990) as Nani
 Purappadu (1990) as Beevathu
 Champion Thomas (1990) as Nalini
 Randaam Varavu (1990) as Dr. Renuka Menon
 Nagarangalil Chennu Raparkam (1990) as Girija
 Ponnaranjanam (1990) as Ayyappan's wife
 Chuvappunada (1990)
 The Judgement (1990)
 Pavakoothu (1990)
 Apsarass (1990)
 Vyooham (1990) as Geetha
 Vasavadutta (1990) as Principal
 Kireedam (1989) as Ambika
 Kaalalppada (1989)
 Krooran (1989)
 Crime Branch (1989) as Adv.Latha
 Jagratha (1989) as Rugmini
 Kandathum Kettathum (1988)
 Ambalakkara Panchayat (1988)
 Swargam (1987)
 Ezhuthappurangal (1987)
 Swathi Thirunal (1987) as Narayani's Thozhi
 Arappatta Kettiya Gramathil (1986) as Sreedevi
 Sree Narayana Guru (1986)
 Prathyekam Sradhikkukka (1986) 
 Rajavinte Makan (1986)
 Sunil Vayassu 20 (1986)
 Kshamichu Ennoru Vakku (1986) as Police Constable
 Veendum (1986) as Doctor
 Aayiram Kannukal (1986) as Ammini
 Malarum Kiliyum (1986) as Vasanthi
 Dheivatheyorthu (1986)
 Karayilakattu Pole (1986) - Dubbing only
 Kattuthee (1985) 
 Sayam Sandhya (1984) as Interviewer
 Aagraham (1984)
 Parasparam (1983) as Student
 Prem Nazeerine Kaanmanilla (1983)
 Rugma (1983)
 Eenam (1983)
 Aadhyathe Anuragam (1983)
 Thayambaka
 Kattaruvi (1983) as Chellamma
 Kaattile Paattu (1982) as Lathadevi
 Snehapoorvam Meera (1982) as Dolly
 Kakka (1982)
 Champalkkadu (1982)
 Chillu (1982) as Servant
 Aambalppoovu (1981) as Geetha
 Aparna (1981)
 Unarthupattu (1980)
 Radha Enna Pennkutti (1979)

Television career

 Paliyathachan (DD Malayalam)
 Preyasi (Surya TV)
 Sagaracharitham
 Pakida Pakida Pambaram (DD Malayalam)
 Agnisakshi
 Jwalayayi
 Veendum Jwalayayi
 Parinamam
 Ayisha
 Devaganga
 Women's Club
 Nagarathil Yakshi
 Jwala
 Uma
 Snehasammanam
 Snehadharangalode
 Swathu
 Vajram
 Ettu Sundarikalum Njanum
 Pavithra Jailillan as Jailer 
 Snehapoorvam Lakshmi
 Manjadimanikal
 Mandoos (Kairali TV)
 Akshayapathram (Asianet)
 Alimanthrikan (Asianet)
 Tharavum Ponmuttaym (DD Malayalam)
 Jalamohini (Asianet)
 Harichandhnam (Asianet)
 Dracula (Asianet)
 Alaudhinte Albuthavilakku (Asianet)
 Velankani Mathavu (Asianet)
 Amma (Asianet)
 Pranayam (Asianet)
 Thulabharam (Surya TV)
 Sree Guruvayoorappan (Surya TV)
 Ente Manasaputhri (Asianet)
 Vava (Surya TV)
 Vasundhara Medicals (Asianet)
 Sooryaputhri (Surya TV)
 Devaragam (Asianet)
 Ammathottil (Asianet)
 Indumukhi Chandramathi (Surya TV) 
 Swamiye Saramayyappa (Surya TV)
 Twenty Twenty One (20:21) (Asianet)
 Alaudeenum Albuthavilakkum (Asianet)
 Chandrodayam (Doordarshan)
 Oru Poo Viriyunnu (DD)
 Paattukalude Paattu (Surya TV)
 Ponnum Poovum (Amrita TV)
 Swami Ayyappan (Asianet)
 Kadamattathu Kathanar (Asianet)
 Ennu Swantham Jani (Surya TV)
 Ganga (Doordarshan)
 Sathyam Sivam Sundaram (Amrita TV)
Ayalathe Sundari (Surya TV)
Police (ACV)
Pookkalam Varavayi (Zee Keralam)
Oru Nimisham
Wish You a Happy New Year
Adipoli Family
Sundarapurushan 
Aanakaryam Chenakaryam - webseries
Kashithumbi
Panchali Swayamvaram

Dramas
 Pramani
 Indulekha
 Swathi Thirunnal

References

External links

Kanakalatha at MSI
http://www.malayalamcinema.com/star-details.php?member_id=137

Actresses in Malayalam cinema
Indian film actresses
Actresses from Kollam
20th-century Indian actresses
21st-century Indian actresses
Indian stage actresses
1960 births
Living people
Actresses in Malayalam television
Indian television actresses
Actresses in Malayalam theatre
Actresses in Tamil cinema